I Am in the World as Free and Slender as a Deer on a Plain is a 2019 Canadian short drama film, directed by Sofia Banzhaf. The film stars Micaela Robertson as an unnamed young woman navigating contemporary millennial dating culture through a series of dates and sexual hookups.

The film premiered at the 2019 Toronto International Film Festival. In December 2019, the film was named to TIFF's annual year-end Canada's Top Ten list for short films.

References

External links

2019 short films
2019 films
2019 drama films
2010s English-language films
Canadian drama short films
2010s Canadian films